Calor is the Latin name of two Italian rivers:
 The Calore Irpino (or Calore Beneventano), a tributary of the Volturno
 The Calore Lucano (or Calore Salernitano), a tributary of the Sele